The University of Texas at San Antonio (UTSA) Institute of Texan Cultures (ITC) is a museum and library located in the Texas Pavilion at HemisFair Park in Downtown San Antonio, Texas. The building which houses the institute a striking example of Brutalist architecture.

It serves as the state's primary center for multicultural education, with exhibits, programs, and events like the Texas Folklife Festival, an annual celebration of the many ethnicities that make up the population of Texas. It has been held yearly since 1972.

The facility, established by the Texas Legislature on May 27, 1965, originally served as the Texas Pavilion at HemisFair '68 before being turned over to the University of Texas System in 1969. UTSA assumed administrative control of the museum in 1973. In 1986, the system designated the institute as a campus of the University of Texas at San Antonio. Now, it is part of UTSA's HemisFair campus.  It is located near the Alamo and the River Walk.

The Institute of Texan Cultures, through its research, collections, exhibits and programs, serves as the forum for the understanding and appreciation of Texas and Texans. The  complex has  of interactive exhibits and displays. The library on the third floor contains manuscripts, rare books, personal papers, over 3 million historical photos and over 700 oral histories.

Funding for the museum comes primarily from three sources: biennial legislative appropriations; exhibit floor and special event admissions; grants, contributions, and other locally generated funds such as the rental of the museum's facilities, and the sale of its publications, audiovisuals, library services, and merchandise from The Museum Store. Major support is provided by the museum's Development Board. The Texas Legislature cut appropriations for the institute by 25% in 2011 causing the institute to rely more on private donations and corporate sponsorship.

ITC fulfills its mandate as the state's center for multicultural education by investigating the ethnic and cultural history of the state and presenting the resulting information with a variety of offerings:

  Exhibits, programs, and special events designed to entertain, inspire, and educate
   A library focusing on ethnic and cultural history
   A historical photo collection of more than 3.5 million images
   An outreach program to schools and other groups
   Teacher-training workshops.

There are displays in the museum representing many cultures and their impact on the history and development of Texas.

In early 2010, ITC became an affiliate as part of the Smithsonian Affiliates program. Affiliate status grants the institute access to the Smithsonian's artifacts, education, and performing arts programs, expert speakers, teacher workshops, and resources to complement and broaden exhibitions. The affiliation agreement marks a new era for the institute. A series of upgrades are planned to revitalize main exhibit floor. As UTSA strives to achieve national research university status, the university's museum strives to become a cultural institution of equal caliber.

Future is Uncertain
University of Texas at San Antonio is considering moving the ITC out of its current facility due to low attendance and to repurpose the land and or the building.

See also
 List of museums in Central Texas
 Caudill Rowlett Scott (CRS)
 Texans All - A series of books organized by the institute

References

External links

Institute of Texan Cultures
A Guide to the University of Texas at San Antonio: Institute of Texan Cultures Records, University of Texas at San Antonio Libraries (UTSA Libraries) Special Collections.
A Guide to the Institute of Texan Cultures Library Collection of HemisFair '68 Materials, University of Texas at San Antonio Libraries (UTSA Libraries) Special Collections.

Texas culture
Museums in San Antonio
History museums in Texas
Art museums and galleries in Texas
University museums in Texas
Ethnic museums in Texas
Smithsonian Institution affiliates
Museums established in 1968
1968 establishments in Texas
World's fair architecture in Texas
HemisFair '68